Kombil (also Romanized as Kombīl; also known as Komīl (Persian: كميل) and Kūmbīl) is a village in Band-e Zarak Rural District, in the Central District of Minab County, Hormozgan Province, Iran. At the 2006 census, its population was 318, in 59 families.

References 

Populated places in Minab County